Dame Ann Heron Gloag DBE (née Souter; born 10 December 1942) is a Scottish  businesswoman, activist, and charity campaigner. She is co-founder of the transport company Stagecoach Group.

According to The Sunday Times Rich List in 2020, Gloag and her brother, Sir Brian Souter, are worth £730 million, a decrease of £145 million from the previous year.

In January 2023, Gloag, with her husband and two other family members, was charged with criminal offences involving human trafficking. She disputes the charges.

Biography
Educated at Caledonian Road Primary School and Perth High School, Gloag qualified as a nurse, and during a 20-year career worked as a burn unit sister. She is ranked as Scotland's richest woman. She is a trustee of charity Mercy Ships and was involved in its creation of a hospital ship.

Stagecoach
Using her father (a bus driver)'s redundancy money, and working with her brother, Brian Souter, and her first husband, Robin, Gloag established the Stagecoach Group in 1980, running buses from Dundee to London. Expansion continued and in the early 1990s, Stagecoach acquired National Bus Company operations in Cumberland, Hampshire, East Midlands, Ribble, Southdown and the United Counties. Stagecoach bought further bus operations in Scotland, Newcastle and London, with Manchester being added in 1993.

Manston Airport
In November 2013, Gloag took ownership of Kent International Airport, also known as Manston Airport, for the sum of £1. Gloag's co-director is Pauline Bradley, a corporate lawyer and former head of joint ventures at Bank of Scotland, described by The Herald as "one of Scotland's most powerful women".

Despite assurances to staff on the long-term investment in the airport, management announced a consultation on closure in April 2014. Uncertainty about the airport's future led flight operators that  were using Manston to leave, notably KLM, which was running a twice-daily service to Amsterdam Schiphol. A number of bids were forthcoming during the consultation period to buy and run the airport, but, on 15 May 2014, Manston was closed with the loss of 144 jobs in the airport and an unknown number in the surrounding area. Gloag did not appear publicly or give a reason for the airport's closure or her refusal to sell.

The trade union Unite said it would challenge the way the consultation on closure was conducted. Sir Roger Gale, Member of Parliament for Thanet North, described Gloag's actions as an act of "corporate vandalism".

, Gale and pressure groups including Save Manston Airport and Why Not Manston? continue to campaign for the reopening of the airport and have opposed alternative uses. In May 2014, Prime Minister David Cameron, in answer to a question from Gale in the Houses of Commons, stated that the future of Manston was the responsibility of the airport owner, but the Government was in negotiation with Gloag. In July 2017 planning inspectors rejected an appeal stating that the site was protected for aviation use under EC4 regulations.

Personal life
Gloag has owned Beaufort Castle near Inverness since 1995, and Kinfauns Castle, near Perth since 2004. She has attempted to block off private access at Kinfauns, on 12 June 2007, a court ruled that she was legally entitled to bar the public from an area of woodland in the grounds of Kinfauns Castle.

Gloag's ex-husband, Robin, father of her late son, Jonathan, was killed in a car crash on 6 December 2007. Their 28-year-old son, Jonathan, hanged himself in Deuchny Wood in 1999. In 1990, Gloag married David McCleary, a widower and a successful owner of multiple businesses, who was previously an organist and minister at the local Church of the Nazarene.

A member of the Church of the Nazarene, Gloag founded the Freedom From Fistula Foundation. After meeting Adam Friedman, she became executive producer of Shout Gladi Gladi, a documentary film explaining the medical and social issues surrounding obstetric fistula in Africa. She also supports international aid charities and has adopted a Kenyan boy, Peter, now aged 30, as well as a 6-year-old Kenyan grandson.

On 20 January 2023, the BBC reported that, together with her husband and two other family members, Gloag had been charged with criminal offences involving human trafficking. She disputed the charges.

Awards and recognitions 
Gloag was made a Dame Commander of the Order of the British Empire in the 2019 New Year Honours list. Gloag, who was made an OBE in 2004, received her damehood in recognition of her business and charitable work in the UK and overseas.

References

External links
 Profile, Scottish-places.info; accessed 10 December 2015

1942 births
Living people
British public transport executives
Dames Commander of the Order of the British Empire
People from Perth, Scotland
People in bus transport
Scottish billionaires
Scottish businesspeople
Scottish nurses
Stagecoach Group
Scottish members of the Church of the Nazarene
Scottish women in business 
People educated at Perth High School
Giving Pledgers
21st-century philanthropists